Project Sauron, also named Remsec is a computer malware  discovered in 2016.

It has been spying computers at government and organizations for five years.
It can steal encryption keys, collect information from air-gapped computers, and record someone’s keystrokes without being detected.

See also 
 Flame (malware)
 Duqu
 Stuxnet

References

Windows trojans
Espionage